Senchi is a town in the Asuogyaman District of the Eastern Region of Ghana.

Location
Senchi is situated along the west banks of the Volta River, downstream from the Akosombo Dam.

Notability

Senchi ferry
Senchi has a ferry station used for the crossing of the Volta River from the west to the Old Akrade on the eastern side. It was the major crossing for vehicular traffic prior to the completion of the construction of the Adomi Bridge in January 1957. In 2014, it experienced very heavy traffic while the Adomi Bridge was closed to traffic for repairs.

Resorts
Senchi is well noted as the location of some resorts and guest houses south of the dam on the Volta River. These include Royal Senchi Resort and The Senchi Consensus

References

Populated places in the Eastern Region (Ghana)